Henry Trévoux or Henri Trévoux, real name Henri Maurice Séraphin Mathieu, (31 march 1880, Grenoble – 16 July 1943, Paris) was a French stage and film actor.

Filmography 
 1929: C'est par amour pour vous Madame by Henry Lepage (short film)
 1931: Un homme en habit de René Guissart 
 1932: Mon cœur balance by René Guissart
 1932: The Last Blow by Jacques de Baroncelli as Frémiet
 1932: Le Crime du Bouif by André Berthomieu : Le commissaire
 1932: Bariole by Benno Vigny
 1932: To the Polls, Citizens by Jean Hémard
 1933: Noces et banquets by Roger Capellani (short film)
 1933: Mademoiselle Josette, ma femme by André Berthomieu : the director
 1933: Plein aux as by Jacques Houssin : Le Dattier
 1933: Pour être aimé by Jacques Tourneur
 1933: The Tunnel by Kurt Bernhardt
 1934: Le Secret d'une nuit by Félix Gandera : the assistant
 1935: Jim la Houlette de André Berthomieu : the publisher
 1935: Odette by Jacques Houssin : Béchamel
 1937: Le Fauteuil 47 by Fernand Rivers : Trémois
 1938: Prince de mon cœur by Jacques Daniel-Norman
 1938: La Présidente by Fernand Rivers
 1938: La Goualeuse by Fernand Rivers : Un inspecteur
 1943: Vautrin de Pierre Billon

Theatre 
 1906: Mademoiselle Josette, ma femme by Robert Charvay and Paul Gavault, Théâtre du Gymnase 
 1909: Le Scandale by Henry Bataille, Théâtre de la Renaissance 
 1909: La Petite Chocolatière by  Paul Gavault, Théâtre de la Renaissance 
 1927: Désiré by Sacha Guitry, Théâtre Édouard VII

References

External links 

 Henri Trévoux sur les Archives du Spectacle.net

1943 deaths
1880 births
French male film actors
French male stage actors
Male actors from Grenoble